Palaeocharinus is a genus of extinct trigonotarbid arachnids known from the Devonian of western Europe. The genus was first found and described in the Rhynie chert in the 1920s by Arthur Stanley Hirst and S. Maulik. The family to which the genus belongs may be paraphyletic.

Species 
 Palaeocharinus calmani (Hirst, 1923) – Early Devonian, Scotland
 Palaeocharinus hornei (Hirst, 1923) – Early Devonian, Scotland
 Palaeocharinus kidstoni (Hirst, 1923) – Early Devonian, Scotland
 Palaeocharinus rhyniensis (Hirst, 1923) – Early Devonian, Scotland
 Palaeocharinus scourfieldi (Hirst, 1923) – Early Devonian, Scotland
 Palaeocharinus tuberculatus (Fayers, Dunlop & Trewin, 2005) – Early Devonian, Scotland

References 

Trigonotarbids
Devonian arachnids
Devonian arthropods of Europe
Devonian Scotland
Early Devonian first appearances
Early Devonian genus extinctions
Prehistoric life of Europe
Taxa named by Arthur Stanley Hirst